Fidel Arellano (10 January 1907 – 6 November 2005) was a Mexican wrestler. He competed in the men's freestyle featherweight at the 1932 Summer Olympics.

References

External links
 

1907 births
2005 deaths
Mexican male sport wrestlers
Olympic wrestlers of Mexico
Wrestlers at the 1932 Summer Olympics
Sportspeople from Guerrero